The Seaboard Coast Line Railroad Depot was a train station in Headland, Alabama.  The depot was built in 1893 by the Abbeville Southern Railway, which built a line to connect Abbeville with the Alabama Midland Railway at Grimes.  The Alabama Midland and Abbeville Southern became part of the Plant System in 1894, which was taken over by the Atlantic Coast Line Railroad in 1901 and merged into the Seaboard Coast Line Railroad in 1967.  Regular passenger service through Headland ended in 1929, although mixed service on freight trains continued through the mid-1950s.  Freight service was discontinued in 1979.  Despite efforts to renovate and repurpose the building, it was demolished after 1980.

The depot was built of local pine and oak, and covered with a gable roof with deep, bracketed eaves.  The western third of the building was divided into two passenger waiting rooms and the agent's office, while the eastern two-thirds was a large freight storage area.  A loading platform ran the length of the building along the tracks.

The station was listed on the National Register of Historic Places in 1980.

References

National Register of Historic Places in Henry County, Alabama
Railway stations on the National Register of Historic Places in Alabama
Railway stations in the United States opened in 1893
Railway stations closed in 1979
Transportation buildings and structures in Henry County, Alabama
Atlantic Coast Line Railroad stations
1893 establishments in Alabama
1979 disestablishments in Alabama
Former railway stations in Alabama